The boys' 12.5 km individual biathlon competition at the 2020 Winter Youth Olympics was held on 11 January at the Les Tuffes Nordic Centre.

Results
The race was started at 13:30.

References

Boys' individual